C. Jack Ellis (born January 6, 1946) is a politician and the former mayor of Macon, Georgia.

Early life and career
Prior to taking office, Ellis served 20 years in the United States Army as a paratrooper, then served two years in Vietnam as a combat soldier. Upon retirement from the U.S. Army, Ellis managed a used car business, served as an executive for the United States Census Bureau, and hosted a public access television show focusing on public and political affairs in the black community.

Mayor of Macon

1999 and 2003 campaigns
Ellis ran for mayor of Macon in 1999. He defeated former Macon Mayor Buck Melton in the 1999 Democratic primary election, and was elected as the city's first African-American mayor in the mayoral general election.

After his first term, he was re-elected in 2003 after defeating several challengers in the Democratic primary and write-in opposition in the general election.

2011 campaign
On April 16, 2011, Ellis officially began a third campaign for mayor of Macon against incumbent mayor Robert Reichert. In the July 19 Democratic primary, he placed second in the four-way race, with 37.6% of the vote. Because Reichert fell just shy of 50% of the vote, a run-off election was scheduled for August 16 between Ellis and Reichert. Ellis lost the election by 537 votes, receiving 9,770 of the 20,077 votes cast. Ellis did not rule out a future run for office.

2013 campaign

Religious views
Early in 2007, Ellis announced that he had become a Sunni Muslim during a ceremony in Senegal, and was seeking to change his legal name to Hakim Mansour Ellis. During a forum in the 2011 campaign, Ellis refused to comment on this topic, except to say that he was a member of Unionville Missionary Baptist Church.

Controversies
In August 2007, C. Jack Ellis sent a letter of solidarity to Hugo Chávez, socialist President of Venezuela and vocal ally of Iran and Cuba. Public reaction in and around Macon was largely negative, with some residents calling for demonstrations and boycotts. Ellis maintained that the declaration was about Chávez's humanitarian efforts, not his political policies.

On April 2, 2008, Macon mayor Robert Reichert received a letter from U.S. Attorney Max Wood accusing the City of Macon, under the Ellis administration, of misusing federal funds and making false statements to government officials. The accusation was in regard to the $900,000 "Safe Schools Initiative grant" given to the city in 2002. The government could also demand that much of the grant money be returned, as well as impose a civil penalty, which the letter stated could be in excess of one million dollars. Ellis stated his confidence that the city had correctly spent the money, and that no wrongdoing had occurred. No criminal charges have been filed.

References

1946 births
Living people
Mayors of Macon, Georgia
African-American mayors in Georgia (U.S. state)
Military personnel from Georgia (U.S. state)
United States Army soldiers
21st-century African-American people
20th-century African-American people